Pressin' On is the fifteenth studio album by Billy Preston, released in 1982. It was his final album released on Motown Records, although he would briefly return to the label in 1986 to record one single ("Since I Held You Close").  The song "I'm Never Gonna Say Goodbye" was used for the Ed Asner/Jodie Foster film O'Hara's Wife. Norman Seeff was the photographer for the album's cover.

Track listing
"Pressin' On" (Benny Medina, Billy Preston, Kerry Ashby) - 5:15
"I'd Like to Go Back Home Again" (Medina, Preston, Ashby) - 5:05
"Loving You Is Easy ('Cause You're Beautiful)" (Preston) - 4:17
"Turn It Out" (Medina, Preston, Ashby) - 3:44
"I'm Never Gonna Say Goodbye" (Artie Butler, Molly Ann Leikin) - 3:39
"Thanks But No Thanks" (Ralph Benatar, Galen Senogles, Geoffrey Leib) - 3:54
"Don't Try to Fight It" (Benatar, Senogles) - 4:18
"I Love You So" (Preston) - 4:12
"I Come to Rest in You" (Preston, Guy Finley) - 3:52

Personnel
Billy Preston - vocals, keyboards, synthesizer
David T. Walker, Larry Lingle, Louis Johnson, Thom Rotella - guitar
Chuck Rainey, Kenny Lee Lewis, Louis Johnson, Neil Stubenhaus - bass
Bill Mays - additional keyboards
Gary Ferguson, James Gadson, Steve Schaeffer - drums
Alan Estes, Bobbye Hall, Paulinho da Costa, Victor Feldman - percussion
Dorothy Ashby - harp
Heart Attack Horns - horns
Bunny Hull, Carla Vaughn, Julia Tillman Waters, Marlena Jeter, Maxi Anderson, Maxine Willard Waters, Merry Clayton, Sharon Robinson, Tony Walthers, Venetta Fields - backing vocals
Ralph Benatar - string and horn arrangements
William Henderson - concertmaster
David Blumberg - arrangement on "I Came to Rest in You"
Technical
Galen Senogles, Rick Riccio, Russ Terrana - engineer
Tony James - executive producer
Johnny Lee - art direction
Norman Seeff -  photography

Billy Preston albums
1982 albums
Albums produced by Billy Preston
Motown albums